Edward George Quirk (February 27, 1925 – June 13, 1962) was an American football fullback in the National Football League (NFL) for the Washington Redskins.  He played college football at the University of Missouri and was drafted in the fifteenth round of the 1948 NFL Draft. He died of a heart ailment in 1962.

References

External links
 

1925 births
1962 deaths
American football fullbacks
Missouri Tigers football players
Players of American football from St. Louis
Washington Redskins players